Joseph Pujol (June 1, 1857 – August 8, 1945), better known by his stage name Le Pétomane, was a French flatulist (professional farter) and entertainer. He was famous for his remarkable control of the abdominal muscles, which enabled him to seemingly fart at will. His stage name combines the French verb péter, "to fart" with the -mane, "-maniac" suffix, which translates to "fartomaniac".  The profession is referred to as "flatulist", "farteur", or "fartiste".

It was a common misconception that Pujol passed intestinal gas as part of his stage performance. Rather, he was allegedly able to "inhale" or move air into his rectum and then control the release of that air with his anal sphincter muscles.  Evidence of his ability to control those muscles was seen in the early accounts of demonstrations of his abilities to fellow soldiers.

Life and career

Joseph Pujol was born in Marseille, one of five children of stonemason and sculptor François Pujol and his wife Rose, in a family of Catalan origin. Soon after he left school, he had a strange experience while swimming in the sea. He put his head under the water and held his breath, whereupon he felt an icy cold penetrating his rear. He ran ashore in fright and was amazed to sense water pouring from his anus.

While serving in the army, he told his fellow soldiers about his special ability, and repeated it for their amusement, sucking up water from a pan into his rectum and then projecting it up to several yards. He found that he could suck in air as well. A baker, Pujol would sometimes entertain his customers by imitating musical instruments and claiming to be playing them behind the counter. Pujol decided to try the stage, and debuted in Marseilles in 1887. When his act was well received, he moved to Paris, where he appeared at the Moulin Rouge in 1892.

Some of the highlights of his stage act involved sound effects of cannon fire and thunderstorms, as well as playing "'O Sole Mio" and "La Marseillaise" on an ocarina through a rubber tube in his anus. He could also blow out a candle from several yards away. His audience included Edward, Prince of Wales; King Leopold II of the Belgians; and Sigmund Freud.

In 1894, the managers of the Moulin Rouge sued Pujol for an impromptu exhibition he gave to aid a friend struggling with economic difficulties. Pujol was fined 3,000 francs, and the Moulin Rouge lost their star attraction as the disagreement led him to set up his own travelling show called the Theatre Pompadour.

In the following decade Pujol tried to 'refine' and make his acts 'gentler'; one of his favourite numbers became a rhyme about a farm which he himself composed, and which he punctuated with anal renditions of the animals' sounds.

With the outbreak of World War I, Pujol retired from the stage and returned to his bakery in Marseilles.  Later he opened a biscuit factory in Toulon. He died in 1945, aged 88, and was buried in the cemetery of La Valette-du-Var, where his grave can still be seen today.

Legacy

Le Pétomane left an enduring legacy and has inspired a number of artistic works. These include several musicals based on his life, such as The Fartiste (awarded Best Musical at the 2006 New York International Fringe Festival) and Seth Rozin's A Passing Wind which was premiered at the Philadelphia International Festival of the Arts in 2011. In addition, Le Pétomane was added to David Lee's 2007 reworked revival of the 1953 Broadway play Can-Can, which had originally been written by Abe Burroughs and Cole Porter. The updated play, staged at the Pasadena Playhouse, featured musical theatre actor Robert Yacko as the fartiste, with sound effects provided by the band's trombone and piccolo players. More recently, the re-released works of English toilet humour specialist Ivor Biggun include "Southern Breeze", a song about a "Famous French Farteur" who describes in rhyme a stroll through a farmyard, accompanied by appropriate farting noises.

Los Angeles-based Sherbourne Press published Jean Nohain and F. Caradec's Le Pétomane as a small hardcover English language edition in 1967. Due to its ‘sensitive’ nature, the usual national publicity venues shied away, some claiming that an author was needed for interviews (both elderly writers lived in France). However, ‘behind the curtain’ acceptance created a buzz within the national radio/TV promotional circuit and word-of-mouth discussion kept the book in stores for several years. Dorset Press, a division of Barnes & Noble, reissued the book in 1993.

The character has been portrayed several times in film. In 1979 Ian MacNaughton made a short humorous film, written by Galton and Simpson called Le Pétomane, based on Joseph Pujol's story and starring veteran comic actor Leonard Rossiter. The 1983 Italian movie Il Petomane, directed by Pasquale Festa Campanile and starring Ugo Tognazzi, gives a poetic rendition of the character, contrasting his deep longing for normality with the condition of 'freak' to which his act relegated him. The 1998 documentary Le Pétomane by Igor Vamos examines Joseph Pujol's place in history through archival films (none of which actually include him), historical documents, photographs, recreations and fake or tongue-in-cheek interviews.

Le Pétomane is also referenced in Blazing Saddles, a 1974 satirical Western comedy film directed by Mel Brooks.  Brooks appears in multiple supporting roles, including the dim-witted Governor William J. Le Petomane, whose name suggests he is full of hot air.

Lepetomane University is the name of the educational establishment in Up the Creek, a 1984 college movie starring Tim Matheson involving a white water rafting race.

Le Pétomane is also a character in the novel The Great Abraham Lincoln Pocket Watch Conspiracy by Jacopo della Quercia.

Le Pétomane also appears as a character in the 2001 Australian-American jukebox musical romantic comedy film Moulin Rouge!, played by Keith Robinson.

In Season 3, Episode 8 of "Two and a Half Men", a ballet studio for children is named "Les Petites Pétomanes" (as seen on its door and window). 

'Le Petoman' (without the e, because English-speaking audiences will pronounce -mane differently from -man) was adapted for the theatre in 2001 by Tony Stowers, from the book 'Le Petomane 1857–1945' by J. Nohain & F. Caradec. It was turned down by Hull Truck, Salisbury Playhouse and the National Theatre in the UK on the grounds that they felt their audiences would be 'too sophisticated' for the subject matter. Instead it has been read in English in Newcastle upon Tyne in 2005, in Paris in 2010 and again in Nantes in 2018, and to this day remains unperformed but often read. In 2010, it was translated into French by Tony Stowers and Kester Lovelace and appears in 'French Collection' and 'Plays: Volume Three' by Tony Stowers.

Danish comedian group "Ørkenens Sønner" ("Sons of the Desert") have among their acts around 2010 a rendition of "Otto Fjærtoman" ("Otto the Fart-Maniac"), a little perpetually-smiling man with a nice suit and open-buttocks trousers, and a surprising ability to do various things fart-related, like inflating balloons or pushing himself across the stage on a skateboard.

See also
 Flatulence humor
 Flatulist
 Mr. Methane
 Roland the Farter
 Toilet humour

References
Notes

Further reading
 Moore, Alison (February 2013) "The Spectacular Anus of Joseph Pujol: Recovering the Pétomane’s Unique Historic Context" French Cultural Studies v.24, n.1, pp. 27–43.
 Nohain, Jean and Caradec, F. (1993) [1967] Le Pétomane 1857–1945: A  Tribute to the Unique Act Which Shook and Shattered the Moulin Rouge. Translated by Warren Tute. New York: Dorset Press ; originally published by Sherbourne Press.

External links
 
 

1857 births
1945 deaths
19th-century French people
20th-century French people
Entertainers from Marseille
Flatulists
Articles containing video clips